Vicente López is a neighborhood in Vicente López Partido, Buenos Aires Province, Argentina. It is a suburb in the Buenos Aires metropolitan area.

It currently has about 24,078 inhabitants. It is bounded to the north by Olivos, to the west by Florida, to the south by the city of Buenos Aires, and to the east by the River Plate.

External links

 Municipal website
 Twitter website
 Facebook website

Populated places in Buenos Aires Province
Populated places established in 1905
Vicente López Partido
1905 establishments in Argentina